Clubbed is a 2008 British drama film about a 1980s factory worker who takes up a job as a club doorman, written by Geoff Thompson and directed by Neil Thompson.

Plot
In 1984, Danny - a lonely factory worker intimidated by life - is battered and humiliated in front of his kids in a random act of violence. His already bleak existence sinks further into the abyss. On the verge of total breakdown, he decides to fight back.

He meets a group of nightclub doormen who take him in and give him the confidence to stand his ground. As he is drawn deeper into their world, he becomes embroiled with the local gangland boss, setting in motion a chain of events with shockingly brutal consequences.

Cast
 Colin Salmon as Louis
 Natalie Gumede as Jo
 Mel Raido as Danny
 Shaun Parkes as Rob
 Scot Williams as "Sparky"
 Maxine Peake as Angela
 Will Poulter as Sparky's Baby Son
 Neil Morrissey as Simon
 Ronnie Fox as Hennessy
 Charlie Clark as Illisa
 Katherine McGolpin as Kay
 Anthony Ghosh as Minor Part At Beginning
 Aicha McKenzie as Helen
 Nick Holder as Mick
 Ellen Thomas as Mrs. Smith
 Ian Ralph as Barney "Fatman"
 Tom McKay as "Skank"
 Michelle Marsh as Skank's Girlfriend
 Nikki Sanderson as "Gee-Gee", Dance Teacher
 Jamie Kenna as Hack
 Ian Virgo as Leonard
 Ciarán Griffiths as "Reaper"
 Hayley Evetts as Reaper's Girlfriend
 Angie Chiefa as Dancer
 Joanne Rozak as Dancer

Reception 
Empire gave the film three stars out of five stating "Performances are varied, but it overcomes its low budget with a suspenseful story, sympathetic leads and cracking ’80s soundtrack."

References

External links
 

2008 films
2008 crime drama films
British crime drama films
Films set in the 1980s
2000s English-language films
2000s British films